See also Namutumba District for Busiki District.

Busiki is one of the six traditional chiefdoms of the kingdom of Busoga in Uganda.

It was founded around 1683 and became a part of the British protectorate in Busoga in 1896. Its ruler is known as the Kisiki.

References 

Busoga